Nabadwip Assembly constituency is an assembly constituency in Nadia district in the Indian state of West Bengal.

Overview
As per orders of the Delimitation Commission, No. 84 Nabadwip Assembly constituency is composed of the following: Nabadwip municipality, Nabadwip community development block, and Bhaluka and Joania gram panchayats of Krishnanagar I community development block.

Nabadwip Assembly constituency is part of No. 13 Ranaghat (Lok Sabha constituency). It was earlier part of Nabadwip (Lok Sabha constituency).

Members of Legislative Assembly

Election results

2021

2011
In the 2011 election, Pundarkshya Saha of Trinamool Congress defeated his nearest rival Sumit Biswas of CPI(M).

 

.# Swing calculated on Congress+Trinamool Congress vote percentages taken together in 2006. On its own the Trinamool Congress vote percentage was +2.35% and the swing was 5.99%.

1977-2006
In the 2006 state assembly elections, Pundarikhsya Saha of  Trinamool Congress won the Nabadwip assembly seat defeating his nearest rival Chhaya Sen Sharma of CPI (M). Contests in most years were multi cornered but only winners and runners are being mentioned. In 2001, Pundarikhsya Saha of Trinamool Congress defeated Jamuna Brahmachari of CPI (M). In 1996, Biswanath Mitra of CPI (M) defeated Kartick Chatterjee of Congress. In 1991 and 1987 Biswanath Mitra of CPI(M) defeated Satish Debnath of Congress. In 1982 and 1977 Debi Prosad Basu of CPI (M) defeated Sasthi Bhusan Pal of Congress.

1951–1972
Radha Raman Saha of Congress won in 1972. Debi Prasad Basu of CPI(M) won in 1971. Sachindra Mohan Nandy of Congress won in 1969 and 1967. Debi Prasad Basu of CPI won in 1962. In 1957 and in independent India's first election in 1951, Niranjan Modak of Congress won the Nabadwip seat.

References

Notes

Citations

Assembly constituencies of West Bengal
Politics of Nadia district